Sungkiang or Songjiang was a province (c.32,000 sq mi/82,880 km2) of the Republic of China. Mudanjiang was the capital. It was one of nine provinces created in Manchuria by the Chinese Nationalist government .  It was bordered on the east by the USSR, and along part of the southern border ran the Nen (Nonni) and Songhua Rivers. In 1949 Hejiang was incorporated into Songjiang and in 1954, northern Songjiang was merged into Heilongjiang province and southern parts into Jilin province.

See also
Administrative divisions of the Republic of China
 

Provinces of the Republic of China (1912–1949)
Former provinces of China
Manchuria
1954 disestablishments in China